The Protoneuridae are a family of damselflies. Most species are commonly known as threadtails, while others are commonly known as bambootails.

Characteristics
These are usually small-sized damselflies and their wings are narrow and mostly transparent, with simple venation. The males tend to be colourful and many have a red, orange, yellow or blue thorax and a black abdomen. Others have a black thorax and brightly coloured abdomen and others are entirely dark. Their usual habitats are the verges of rivers and streams and the margins of large lakes.

Update
Now Pseudostigmatidae and New World Protoneuridae are sunk in Coenagrionidae and Old World Protoneuridae in Platycnemididae.

Genera
The family contains the following genera :

Amazoneura Machado, 2004
Arabineura Schneider and Dumont, 1995 
Caconeura Kirby, 1890 
Chlorocnemis Selys, 1863
Drepanoneura von Ellenrieder & Garrison, 2008 
Disparoneura Selys, 1860
Elattoneura Cowley, 1935
Epipleoneura Williamson, 1915
Epipotoneura Williamson, 1915
Esme Fraser, 1922
Forcepsioneura Lencioni, 1999
Idioneura Selys, 1860
Isomecocnemis Cowley, 1936
Lamproneura De Marmels, 2003
Melanoneura Fraser, 1922
Microneura Hagen in Selys, 1886
Neoneura Selys, 1860
Nososticta Selys, 1860
Peristicta Hagen in Selys, 1860
Phasmoneura Williamson, 1916
Phylloneura Fraser, 1922 
Prodasineura Cowley, 1934
Proneura Selys, 1889
Protoneura Selys in Sagra, 1857
Psaironeura Williamson, 1915
Roppaneura Santos, 1966

See also

 List of damselflies of the world (Protoneuridae)

References

 
Taxa named by Robert John Tillyard
Odonata families